Rohini Heliport is a Heliport located at Sector 36, Rohini in Delhi, India. It is the first Heliport in India. Union Civil Aviation Minister Ashok Gajapathi Raju inaugurated the new facility on 28 February 2017. The Heliport was proposed by the Ministry of Civil Aviation and approved under the Master Plan of Delhi. The Ministry of Environment accorded in-principle approval to the proposal in June 2011.

About
The Rohini Heliport, owned by Pawan Hans Limited, is the first of its kind in the country. The heliport is spread over 25 acres, a few kilometers away from the Rithala metro station, Delhi. It consists of a terminal building having a capacity of 150 passengers, 4 Hangars with a parking capacity of 16 helicopters and 9 parking bays. The facility has separate air traffic control (ATC), fire and fuelling services. It is home to a Maintenance, Repair and Overhaul (MRO) facility to be used for the Pawan Hans fleet as well as for third-party maintenance work.

Construction
The Rohini Heliport was constructed by Ahmedabad-based Dineshchandra R. Agrawal Infracon Private Limited (DRA Infracon) at a cost of around ₹100 crores.

Delhi Darshan
From April 2017, visitors can take a helicopter ride and Delhi Darshan by Pawan Hans helicopters and experience the breathtaking beauty through aerial view of Pitampura TV Tower, Majnu Ka Tilla, Red Fort, Raj Ghat, Akshardham Temple and surrounding areas for 20 minutes.

See also 
 Transport in Delhi

References 

Heliports in India
Transport in Delhi
Buildings and structures in Delhi